Édgar Gerardo González Elizondo (born February 23, 1983) is a Mexican professional baseball pitcher for the Rieleros de Aguascalientes of the Mexican League. He has played in Major League Baseball (MLB) for the Arizona Diamondbacks, Oakland Athletics, Colorado Rockies, Houston Astros and Toronto Blue Jays and in the Korea Baseball Organization (KBO) for the LG Twins.

González was the sixth major leaguer from Monterrey, Nuevo León, México, joining Óscar Villarreal, Felipe Montemayor, Bobby Treviño, Héctor Torres, and Alex Treviño. He was the 94th native of Mexico to appear in the majors and the 53rd pitcher from Mexico to work a big league game when he debuted with the Diamondbacks on June 1, . At that time, he was the youngest pitcher in Major League Baseball, at 20 years old.

He throws a 4-seam fastball, slider, 2-seam fastball, and a changeup.

Professional career

Arizona Diamondbacks
González signed with the Arizona Diamondbacks as a non-drafted free agent on April 18, . When he did not report for his assignment in the Dominican Republic, he was placed on the suspended list for 2000-. He was assigned to Single-A South Bend Silver Hawks of the Midwest League in 2002. On April 14, in only his second professional start, he tossed a no-hitter against West Michigan for his first professional win. He did not issue a walk and faced the minimum 27 batters because he picked off the only baserunner of the game (reached on an error). He was 11–8 with a 2.91 ERA and 110 strikeouts with South Bend before earning a promotion to the High-A Lancaster JetHawks of the California League in August, the last month of the season. He finished in Lancaster 3–0 with a 0.78 ERA and 21 strikeouts against 3 walks in 4 games started. His 14 victories in 2002 tied for second among Arizona minor leaguers. He was pitcher of the month of August in the Arizona farm system after combining 5–0 with a 1.18 combined in the two levels.

González was assigned to the Double-A El Paso Diablos of the Texas League in 2003. His stay at El Paso was a short one, with only 6 games started and going 2–2 with a 3.50 ERA before being called up early May to the Triple-A Tucson Sidewinders. He went 3–2 with Tucson before being called to the major league team for a brief stay. He finished the season at Tucson with an 8–7 record and a 3.75 ERA in 20 games. He was selected to participate in the All-Star Futures Game on July 13 in Chicago, working a scoreless frame for the World Team.

González was promoted on June 1, 2003, to face the San Diego Padres at Qualcomm Stadium. Arizona won the game 10–4. He picked up his first major league win, pitching 5.2 innings allowing 10 hits for 3 runs and striking out 4. He also collected his first major league hit. He had another start on June 6 against the Indians at Arizona where he took his first loss before returning to Tucson. When the rosters expanded in September, he was called up and pitched in 7 games (all in relief). He finished the season with a 2–1 record and a 4.91 ERA.

In several stints with the big club, he ended with 0–9 record with a 9.32 ERA in 10 starts for the Diamondbacks. His best game came August 29 in Cincinnati where he took a no-hitter to the 7th inning and lost it to an infield hit by Felipe López and later lost the shutout to a home run by Adam Dunn.

 was the redemption year for González. After a rough 2004 in MLB and spending almost the complete 2005 season in the minors, Edgar stated his case for a spot in the rotation for the next year. He was called up in June to replace in the rotation Russ Ortiz who was released. He pitched two good games (quality starts), but lost the two because of no run support. After Juan Cruz was activated from the disabled list, González was moved to the bullpen where he struggled to adapt and was demoted to Tucson on July 19 to continue to pitch as a starter. He returned to team on September and took the place in the rotation of struggling Enrique González. He had 3 starts in September, the 3 being excellent games, reaching 7 innings in two of them and not allowing more than 2 runs in each game. He ended the year 3–4 with an ERA of 4.22. His record as a starter was 2–3 with a 3.00 ERA.

 was the first year González started the season with the major league club. He earned a spot in the rotation after going 5–0 during spring training. After Randy Johnson was activated from the disabled list, he lost his job to Micah Owings in a tight race. He spent the remainder of the season as the long reliever of the Diamondbacks and making spot starts. He was out of minor league options so he could not be sent to the minor leagues without exposing him to waivers.

Eddy González began the  season in the bullpen, but was moved into the starting rotation when starter Doug Davis was diagnosed with thyroid cancer. In five starts, he was 1–2 with a 6.55 ERA, averaging 4.4 innings per start. He then lost his starting job to Max Scherzer and was moved back to the bullpen after Scherzer pitched 4⅓ innings of perfect relief for González on April 29.

Oakland Athletics
On February 9, González signed a minor league contract with an invitation to spring training with the Oakland Athletics. He appeared in 26 games with Oakland, including 6 starts. He had a 0–4 record and 5.51 ERA in those appearances. In October 2009, González was granted free agency.

LG Twins
He began the 2010 season with the LG Twins in the Korea Baseball Organization. He was 0–6 with a 7.68 ERA for the Twins  before he was released.

Sultanes de Monterrey
He then signed with Sultanes de Monterrey in the Mexican League.

Los Angeles Dodgers
After 3 starts in Mexico, he signed with the Los Angeles Dodgers on August 20 and was assigned to the triple-A Albuquerque Isotopes. He made four starts for the Isotopes, with a 1–1 record and 4.81 ERA.

Tampa Bay Rays
Edgar signed a minor league deal with Tampa Bay on March 2, 2011. He was released on June 6, after recording a 3.72 ERA in 48 1/3 innings with the Durham Bulls.

Colorado Rockies
He signed with the Colorado Rockies and was called up to the majors on August 10. On August 15, he was designated for assignment. After the 2011 season, he elected for free agency.

Oakland Athletics
On November 3, 2011, Gonzalez signed a minor league contract with the Oakland Athletics. On April 3, 2012 gonzalez was released by the Oakland Athletics.

Colorado Rockies
Gonzalez pitched for the Colorado Sky Sox, the PCL (AAA) affiliate of the Colorado Rockies.

Houston Astros
Gonzalez signed with the Houston Astros on August 23, 2012. He made his debut with the Astros on September 3, 2012. On April 5, 2013 he was designated for assignment.

Toronto Blue Jays
On April 7, 2013, González was claimed on waivers from the Astros by the Toronto Blue Jays. González was activated by the Blue Jays on April 9. On April 12, he was outrighted to the Triple-A Buffalo Bisons to make room for Casper Wells. González was recalled on May 8 when J. A. Happ was placed on the disabled list. He was designated for assignment on May 9. On May 11, González cleared waivers and elected free agency rather than an assignment back to Buffalo.

Return to the Houston Astros
The Astros signed González on May 12, 2013. Philip Humber was designated for assignment to make room on the 40-man roster for Gonzalez. He was outrighted off the roster on September 7, 2013. He became a free agent after the season.

Cincinnati Reds
González signed a minor league deal with the Cincinnati Reds in January 2014. He became a free agent after the season.

Sultanes de Monterrey (second stint)
González signed with the Sultanes de Monterrey of the Mexican League for the 2015 season. He played with the club in 2016, 2017, 2018, and 2019. González did not play in a game in 2020 due to the cancellation of the Mexican League season because of the COVID-19 pandemic.
After the 2020 season, he played for Mexico in the 2021 Caribbean Series.

El Águila de Veracruz
On March 13, 2021, González was loaned to El Águila de Veracruz of the Mexican League. In 10 starts, he registered a 2–6 record with a 6.59 ERA in 42.1 innings pitched.

Acereros de Monclova
On July 19, 2021, González was loaned to the Acereros de Monclova of the Mexican League for the remainder of the 2021 season.

Saraperos de Saltillo
On October 6, 2021, González was returned to the Sultanes de Monterrey of the Mexican League. However, prior to the 2022 season, on March 23, 2022, he was loaned to the Saraperos de Saltillo. González pitched in 20 games for Saltillo, starting 13 and posting a 1-4 record and 6.75 ERA with 43 strikeouts in 58.2 innings of work.

Rieleros de Aguascalientes
On March 6, 2023, González signed with the Rieleros de Aguascalientes of the Mexican League.

Winter baseball
In the winter, he plays in the Mexican Pacific League for the Naranjeros de Hermosillo. During the 2002–2003 season, when he was 19 years old, he was named Rookie of the Year and Pitcher of the Year going 8–1 with a 1.89 ERA.

References

External links

1983 births
Living people
Acereros de Monclova players
Albuquerque Isotopes players
Arizona Diamondbacks players
Baseball players from Nuevo León
Buffalo Bisons (minor league) players
Colorado Rockies players
Colorado Springs Sky Sox players
Durham Bulls players
El Águila de Veracruz players
El Paso Diablos players
Houston Astros players
KBO League pitchers
Lancaster JetHawks players
LG Twins players
Louisville Bats players
Major League Baseball pitchers
Major League Baseball players from Mexico
Mexican expatriate baseball players in Canada
Mexican expatriate baseball players in South Korea
Mexican expatriate baseball players in the United States
Mexican League baseball pitchers
Naranjeros de Hermosillo players
National baseball team players
Navegantes del Magallanes players
Mexican expatriate baseball players in Venezuela
Oakland Athletics players
Oklahoma City RedHawks players
Sacramento River Cats players
Saraperos de Saltillo players
South Bend Silver Hawks players
Sportspeople from Monterrey
Sultanes de Monterrey players
Toronto Blue Jays players
Tri-City ValleyCats players
Tucson Sidewinders players
Tomateros de Culiacán players
2006 World Baseball Classic players